WRLC (91.7 FM, "The Thunder") is a non-commercial educational radio station licensed to serve Williamsport, Pennsylvania, United States.  The station is owned by Lycoming College.

WRLC broadcasts a college radio format.

References

External links
 WRLC official website
 

RLC
RLC
Lycoming College